Charlotte Schellhorn (1922–1945) was a German film actress. She committed suicide at the age of twenty three, having appeared in thirteen films.

Selected filmography
 The Muzzle (1938)
 Der singende Tor (1939)
 Who's Kissing Madeleine? (1939)
 Left of the Isar, Right of the Spree (1940)
 The Swedish Nightingale (1941)

References

Bibliography
 Goble, Alan. The Complete Index to Literary Sources in Film. Walter de Gruyter, 1999.

External links

1922 births
1945 deaths
German film actresses
1945 suicides
Suicides in Germany